Dolmatov or Dolmatova (feminine) is a Russian last name.

The following people share this last name:
Aleksandr Dolmatov, Russian opposition activist
Ilya Dolmatov, Russian footballer
Oleg Dolmatov, а former Russian footballer and a current manager.
Sergei Dolmatov (footballer), Russian footballer
Sergey Dolmatov, Russian Grandmaster of chess and former World Junior Chess Champion.

Russian-language surnames